Richard William Byrne is an Emeritus Professor in the School of Psychology and Neuroscience of the University of St Andrews.

With an h-index of 77, he is renowned in the area of the evolution of cognitive and social behavior such as machiavellian intelligence.

Selected research
Townsend, S.W., Koski, S.E., Byrne, R.W., Slocombe, K.E., Bickel, B., Boeckle, M., Braga Goncalves, I., Burkart, J.M., Flower, T., Gaunet, F. and Glock, H.J., 2017. Exorcising G rice's ghost: An empirical approach to studying intentional communication in animals. Biological Reviews, 92(3), pp. 1427–1433.
Hobaiter, C. and Byrne, R.W., 2014. The meanings of chimpanzee gestures. Current Biology, 24(14), pp. 1596–1600.
Hobaiter, C. and Byrne, R.W., 2011. Serial gesturing by wild chimpanzees: its nature and function for communication. Animal cognition, 14(6), pp. 827–838.
Hobaiter, C. and Byrne, R.W., 2011. The gestural repertoire of the wild chimpanzee. Animal cognition, 14(5), pp. 745–767.
Whiten, A. and Byrne, R.W., 1988. Taking (Machiavellian) intelligence apart. Clarendon Press/Oxford University Press.

References

People associated with the University of St Andrews
Behavioral neuroscientists
Year of birth missing (living people)
Living people
20th-century British scientists
21st-century British psychologists